Cher was the second concert residency by American singer-actress Cher at Caesars Palace in Las Vegas, Nevada. For the three-year engagement, Cher received $60 million. Performing at The Colosseum at Caesars Palace, the first show occurred on May 6, 2008 and the last show was on February 5, 2011. The show included 14 dancers and four aerialists, with a total of 17 costumes designed by Bob Mackie. The residency grossed over $97 million during its three-year run.

Set list 
This set list is representative for the opening concert on May 6, 2008. It doesn't represent all shows.
"I Still Haven't Found What I'm Looking For"
"Song for the Lonely"
"All or Nothing"
"I Found Someone"
"Love Is a Battlefield"
"The Beat Goes On" 
"All I Really Want to Do"
"Gypsys, Tramps & Thieves" / "Dark Lady"
"Half-Breed"
"Don't Leave Me This Way" / "Take Me Home"
"Love Hurts"
"The Way of Love"
"After All"
"Walking in Memphis"
"The Shoop Shoop Song (It's in His Kiss)"
"Strong Enough"
"If I Could Turn Back Time" 

Encore
"Believe"

Shows

Personnel

Band 
Lead vocals - Cher
Background vocals - Stacy Campbell, Jenny Douglas-Foote, Patti Russo, Danni Gee, and Nichelle Tillman
Musical Director/Keyboards/Vocals - Paul Mirkovich
Guitars/Background Vocals - David Barry
Drums - Mark Schulman or Nate Morton
Keyboards - Darrell Smith
Bass - Alexander (Sasha) Krivstov
Tenor Saxophone - Glenn Erwin

References

External links 

 Cher's Official Web Page
 Residency Show's Official Site

2008 concert residencies
2009 concert residencies
2010 concert residencies
2011 concert residencies
Caesars Palace
Cher concert residencies
Concert residencies in the Las Vegas Valley